John T. Wood may refer to:

 John Taylor Wood (1830–1904), U.S. Navy, Confederate Navy
 John Travers Wood (1878–1954), U.S. Representative from Idaho
 John Turtle Wood (1821–1890), British architect, engineer, and archaeologist

See also
 John Thomas Archer Wood (c. 1872–1954), English footballer